Rensved is a village in Jämtland, Sweden, with three farms.

Populated places in Jämtland County